The following is the qualification system for the Athletics at the 2023 Pan American Games competition.

Qualification system
A total of 778 athletes will qualify to compete. Each nation may enter a maximum of two athletes in each individual event, and one team per relay event. Each event has a maximum number of competitors and a minimum performance standard. Chile as host nation, is granted an automatic athlete slot per event, in the event no one qualifies for that respective event.

The winner of each individual event (plus top two relay teams per event), from four regional qualification tournaments automatically qualified with the standard (even if not reached). If an event quota is not filled, athletes will be invited till the maximum number per event is reached.

For relays, each country can enter two relay only competitors to participate. The other members of each relay team  must be registered in an individual event. 

Qualifying standards must be achieved between 1 January 2018 and 18 September 2023.

Qualification timeline

Track events

Men's track events

Men's 100 m 
Does not include indoor achievements or races with wind above 2.0 m/s.
Entry number: 24 athletes

Men's 200 m 

Entry number: 24 athletes

Men's 400 m 

Entry number: 18 athletes

Men's 800 m 

Entry number: 18 athletes

Men's 1500 m 

Entry number: 13 athletes

Men's 5000 m 

Entry number: 13 athletes

Men's 10,000 m 

Entry number: 13 athletes

Men's 110 m hurdles 
Entry number: 18 athletes

Men's 400 m hurdles 
Entry number: 18 athletes

Men's 3000 m steeplechase 
Entry number: 13 athletes

Women's track events

Women's 100 m 
Entry number: 24 athletes

Women's 200 m 
Entry number: 24 athletes

Women's 400 m 
Entry number: 18 athletes

Women's 800 m 
Entry number: 18 athletes

Women's 1500 m 
Entry number: 13 athletes

Women's 5000 m 
Entry number: 13 athletes

Women's 10,000 m 
Entry number: 13 athletes

Women's 100 m hurdles 
Does not include indoor achievements

Entry number: 18 athletes

Women's 400 m hurdles 

Entry number: 18 athletes

Women's 3000 m steeplechase 

Entry number: 13 athletes

Road events

Men's road events

Men's marathon 
Entry number: 21 athletes

Men's 20 km walk 
Entry number: 17 athletes

Women's road events

Women's marathon 

Entry number: 21 athletes

Women's 20 km walk 
Entry number: 17 athletes

Field events

Men's field events

Men's high jump 
Entry number: 12 athletes

Men's pole vault 
Entry number: 12 athletes

Men's long jump 
Entry number: 12 athletes

Men's triple jump 
Entry number: 12 athletes

Men's shot put 
Entry number: 12 athletes

Men's discus throw 
Entry number: 12 athletes

Men's hammer throw 
Entry number: 12 athletes

Men's javelin throw 
Entry number: 12 athletes

Women's field events

Women's high jump 
Entry number: 12 athletes

Women's pole vault 
Entry number: 12 athletes

Women's long jump 
Entry number: 12 athletes

Women's triple jump 
Entry number: 12 athletes

Women's shot put 
Entry number: 12 athletes

Women's discus throw 
Entry number: 12 athletes

Women's hammer throw 
Entry number: 12 athletes

Women's javelin throw 
Entry number: 12 athletes

Combined events

Men's decathlon 
Entry number: 16 athletes

Women's heptathlon 
Entry number: 16 athletes

Relay events 
Each invited NOC will be able to enter a maximum of 2 (two) competitors to participate only in each relay race. For the mixed 4x400m relay they must enter 1 woman and 1 man. The other 4 (four) members of each relay team with a maximum of 6 (six) athletes (4x100m, 4x400m and mixed 4x400m) should be entered in an individual event.

Men's 4 × 100 m relay 
Entry number: 12 teams

Men's 4 × 400 m relay 
Entry number: 12 teams

Women's 4 × 100 m relay 
Entry number: 12 teams

Women's 4 × 400 m relay 
Entry number: 12 teams

Mixed 4 × 400 m relay 
Entry number: 8 teams

References

P
P
Qualification for the 2023 Pan American Games
Athletics at the 2023 Pan American Games